Steiractinia is a genus of South American plants in the tribe Heliantheae within the family Asteraceae.

 Species

References

Heliantheae
Flora of South America
Asteraceae genera